Stenomelania boninensis is a species of freshwater snail, an aquatic gastropod mollusc in the family Thiaridae.

The specific name boninensis refer to Bonin Islands, where this species occur.

The sister species of Stenomelania boninensis is Stenomelania juncea.

Distribution 
Distribution of Stenomelania boninensis include Bonin Islands only, Japan.

The type locality is "Bonin Islands".

Distribution 
Stenomelania boninensis inhabits rivers.

References

External links 

Thiaridae
Gastropods described in 1856